Olivier Anken (born 10 February 1957 in Morges, Switzerland) is a retired ice hockey player who played for EHC Biel in the Swiss National League A.  He also represented the Switzerland men's national ice hockey team on several occasions in the World Championships and Olympics. He competed in the men's tournament at the 1988 Winter Olympics.  He played his entire NLA career with EHC Biel, becoming the first player to have his jersey retired by the club. Current national team goalie Joren van Pottelberghe has decided to honour him by using Anken's likeness on his mask as a tribute.

References

External links

1957 births
Living people
EHC Biel players
Olympic ice hockey players of Switzerland
People from Morges
Swiss ice hockey goaltenders
Ice hockey players at the 1988 Winter Olympics
Sportspeople from the canton of Vaud